John Frederick Kihlstrom (born October 24, 1948) is an American cognitive social psychologist. He is Professor Emeritus in the Department of Psychology at the University of California, Berkeley, where he originally began teaching in 1997. In 2013, he was named the Richard and Rhoda Goldman Distinguished Professor in the UC Berkeley College of Letters and Science. He is known for his research on the unconscious mind. He was formerly the editor-in-chief of Psychological Science.

References

External links
Faculty page 
Profile at Social Psychology Network

1948 births
Living people
American social psychologists
American cognitive psychologists
People from Norwich, New York
University of Pennsylvania alumni
University of California, Berkeley College of Letters and Science faculty
Academic journal editors
Psychological Science editors